The Firebrand (1922 film), a silent film directed by Alan James
 The Firebrand (1962 film), a film directed by Maury Dexter
 The Firebrand (Bradley novel), a 1987 novel by Marion Zimmer Bradley
 The Firebrand (Kemp novel), a 2003 novel by Debra A. Kemp
The Firebrand (anarchist publication), which became Free Society in 1897

See also
 Firebrand (disambiguation)
 The Firebrand of Florence, a Broadway operetta